Johannisbach is a stream in North Rhine-Westphalia, Germany. It flows through Aachen, merges with the Pau and the Paunell and then discharges into the river Wurm.

See also
List of rivers of North Rhine-Westphalia

Rivers of North Rhine-Westphalia
Rivers of Germany